Solomon's Temple was a temple in Jerusalem described in the Hebrew Bible.

Solomon's Temple may also refer to:
Solomon's Temple, Aizawl, a Christian church in India
Solomon's Temple, Buxton, a Victorian hill marker in England
Solomon Temple (Grand Canyon), a summit in the Grand Canyon, USA
Temple of Solomon (São Paulo), a colossal replica in Brazil
Youngstown Ridge, a mountain in Pennsylvania, United States, consisting of Sugarbrush Ridge and Solomon's Temple Ridge